The third season of Saravanan Meenatchi began airing on 18 July 2016 and finished on 17 August 2018. It consisted of 575 episodes.  The show starred Saravanan Meenatchi (season 2) fame Rachitha Mahalakshmi playing the female lead role as Meenatchi and Sun Music anchor Rio Raj playing the male lead role as Saravanan.

The 2nd longest Tamil TV series ended up with season 3 being the last version of the Saravanan Meenatchi franchise after running successfully for 1765 episodes as of 17 August 2018  (7 years).

Synopsis
Love blossoms between a simple middle class boy Saravanan (Rio Raj) and a rich girl Meenatchi (Rachitha Mahalakshmi), an MBA graduate from London. Despite the differences in their background, Saravanan and Meenakshi get married and lead a happy life together.

Cast

Main
 Rachitha Mahalakshmi as Meenatchi Saravanan / Vedhavalli: Saravanan's wife, Lakshmi's first daughter and Veluchamy's Second daughter in law
 Rio Raj as Saravanan Veluchamy: Ramasamy's Grandson; Meenatchi's husband, Veluchamy's Second son and Muthazhagu's ex-fiance
 Gayathri Yuvraj as Muthazhagu Sankarapandi: Sankarapandi's wife; Palani's first daughter and Raji's best friend, Saravanan's ex-fiance
 Ravi Chandran as Veluchamy: Ramasamy's son; Sankarapandi, Saravanan, Sathya, Raji's father and Deivanai's husband and Palani's brother and Maruthu's best friend
 Senthi Kumari as Deivanai Veluchamy: Sankarapandi, Saravanan, Sathya, Raji's mother and Veluchamy's wife; Ramasamy's daughter in law
 Rajasekar as Ramasamy: Veluchamy and Palani's father; Sankarapandi, Saravanan, Sathya and Raji's Grand father
 Sankarapandi as Sankarapandi Veluchamy: Veluchamy's first son; Saravanan, Sathya and Raji's elder brother ; Muthazhagu's husband
 Deepa Shankar as Pazhaniyammal [Pazhani]: Veluchamy's sister and Ramasamy's daughter; Muthazhagu and Thangam's mother
 Syamantha Kiran as Sathyavathi Sakthivel a.k.a.[Sathya]: Sankarapandi's younger sister and Saravanan and Raji's elder sister, Veluchamy's first daughter; Sakthivel's wife
 Raj Kumar as Sakthivel: Sathya's husband
 Pavithra Janani as Rajeswari Veluchamy a.k.a. [Raji]:  Veluchamy's Second daughter; Sankarapandi, Sathya and Saravanan's younger sister and Randi's love interest

Recurring

Awards and nominations

See also
 Saravanan Meenatchi
 Saravanan Meenatchi (season 2)

References

External links
Official Website at Hotstar

2015 Tamil-language television seasons
Star Vijay original programming
Tamil-language television shows